Aristida pungens is a member of the family Poaceae, known in Arabic as drinn.

Uses
Aristida pungens is a tall perennial plant with deep roots and long leaves. Extremely drought-resistant, drinn grows in areas with as little as 70 mm of rainfall per year. A traditional food plant in Africa,

References

pungens
Flora of Morocco
Flora of North Africa
Flora of Western Asia
Crops originating from Africa
Cereals